Von LMO (born Frankie Cavallo; March 10, 1951) is an American singer, songwriter and guitarist.

History 
Cavallo has made various claims about his life and origins. At times, he has claimed to have been born in 1924 to Sicilian parents living in Brooklyn, at other times he has said that he is an extraterrestrial from the planet Strazar. Cavallo has cited Bill Haley & His Comets and Jerry Lee Lewis as being particularly inspirational for his music.

In the 1990s, Cavallo collaborated with the San Francisco Bay Area bands Monoshock and OATS. Both were very short-lived.

In 2007, Cavallo was convicted of second-degree robbery, and sentenced to three and a half years. He was released from prison in 2010 and began performing with former collaborator Otto von Ruggins in Avant Duel, a space rock outfit based in Brooklyn, New York. Avant Duel debuted with Beyond Human on March 10, 2012, marking Cavallo's first studio release in over fifteen years.

Influence 
In 1994, Foetus released a cover of Cavallo's song "Outside of Time" on the single Vice Squad Dick.

Julian Cope is a notable admirer of Cavallo's music, which he has called a work of genius. He has written a rave review of the album Red Resistor on his website.

Suicide front-man Alan Vega described his admiration of Cavallo, writing "Red Transistor... Von LMO sang and played guitar and Rudolph Grey was on guitar or bass and it was total insanity. Von LMO was a nut, a great nut. I was afraid to be in the same room as him. One night they played at Max's and everyone was too afraid to sit up front as they smashed guitars and things were flying all over the place. I went into the front room in fear of my life and tried to get everyone to come with me. Nobody came with me because it was such an intense show."

Discography 

Solo
 Future Language (1981, Strazar)
 Cosmic Interception (1994, Variant)
 Red Resistor (1996, Variant)

with Red Transistor
 Not Bite/We're Not Crazy (1990, Ecstatic Peace!)

with Avant Duel
 Beyond Human (2012, Avant Duel)

References

External links 
Avant Duel at ReverbNation

1951 births
Living people
American multi-instrumentalists
American male singer-songwriters
American rock singers
American rock songwriters
Musicians from Brooklyn
Singer-songwriters from New York (state)
No wave musicians